Olsen Field at Blue Bell Park is a baseball stadium in College Station, Texas, that is home to the Texas A&M baseball program. The stadium was dedicated on March 21, 1978, and is named in honor of C. E. "Pat" Olsen, a 1923 graduate of Texas A&M University and a former baseball player in the New York Yankees farm system. Olsen Field has served as an NCAA regional site five times and had its 1999 regional attendance ranked second with 53,287. The first NCAA Regional Tournament held at Olsen Field was in 1989.

In 2004 Sports Illustrated on Campus ranked Olsen Field "the best college baseball venue". Olsen Field has been known to be one of the more hostile environments in college baseball, as seen by the Aggie baseball fans being called RAggies for have a reputation of fiercely "ragging" opponents.

Olsen Field underwent a major renovation that began on June 7, 2011, funded in part by donations from the owners of Blue Bell Creameries, based in nearby Brenham.  In return, Blue Bell gained naming rights. Some new features of the stadium included an expanded concourse and concessions area, luxury suites, a new press box, club seating, two grass berms, expanded locker rooms and coaches offices, a student athletic center, and extended seating closer to the field. However, the seating capacity was decreased from 7,000 to 5,400 to accommodate the changes (although with standing room only will still hold over 7,000).  Olsen Field reopened on February 17, 2012, for the first game of the 2012 baseball season even though some projects were not completely finished; the remaining work was completed on non-game days.

In 2015, the Aggies ranked 7th among Division I baseball programs in attendance, averaging 4,857 per home game. On April 10, 2018, the attendance record after the renovation was set with 7,537 in attendance to watch the Texas A&M Aggies face the Texas Longhorns.

See also
 List of NCAA Division I baseball venues

References

External links
 Aggie Athletics Blue Bell Park Web Page

College baseball venues in the United States
Texas A&M Aggies baseball venues
Baseball venues in Texas
Sports venues in College Station, Texas
Southwest Conference Baseball Tournament venues
1978 establishments in Texas
Sports venues completed in 1978